Ski jumping at the 2022 European Youth Olympic Winter Festival was held from 23 to 25 March at Lahti Sports Center  in Lahti, Finland.

Competition schedule

Medal summary

Medal table

Boys' events

Girls' events

Mixed event

References 

2022
European Youth Olympic Winter Festival
2022 European Youth Olympic Winter Festival events